Alejandro Davila McAllister (born 13 October 1972) is a Colombian equestrian. He competed in the individual jumping event at the 1996 Summer Olympics.

Notes

References

1972 births
Living people
Colombian male equestrians
Olympic equestrians of Colombia
Equestrians at the 1996 Summer Olympics
Place of birth missing (living people)
20th-century Colombian people